Brest is a port city in the Finistère department, Brittany. Located in a sheltered bay not far from the western tip of the peninsula, and the western extremity of metropolitan France, Brest is an important harbour and the second French military port after Toulon. The city is located on the western edge of continental France. With 142,722 inhabitants in a 2007 census, Brest forms Western Brittany's largest metropolitan area (with a population of 300,300 in total), ranking third behind only Nantes and Rennes in the whole of historic Brittany, and the 19th most populous city in France; moreover, Brest provides services to the one million inhabitants of Western Brittany. Although Brest is by far the largest city in Finistère, the préfecture (regional capital) of the department is the much smaller Quimper.

During the Middle Ages, the history of Brest was the history of its castle. Then Richelieu made it a military harbour in 1631. Brest grew around its arsenal until the second part of the 20th century. Heavily damaged by the Allies' bombing raids during World War II, the city centre was completely rebuilt after the war. At the end of the 20th century and the beginning of the 21st century, the deindustrialization of the city was followed by the development of the service sector. Nowadays, Brest is an important university town with 23,000 students. Besides a multidisciplinary university, the University of Western Brittany, Brest and its surrounding area possess several prestigious French elite schools such as École Navale (the French Naval Academy), Télécom Bretagne and the Superior National School of Advanced Techniques of Brittany (ENSTA Bretagne, formerly ENSIETA). Brest is also an important research centre, mainly focused on the sea, with among others the largest Ifremer (French Research Institute for Exploitation of the Sea) centre, le Cedre (Centre of Documentation, Research and Experimentation on Accidental Water Pollution) and the French Polar Institute.

Brest's history has since the 17th century been linked to the sea: the Académie de Marine (Naval Academy) was founded in 1752 in this city. The aircraft carrier  was built there. Every four years, Brest hosts the international festival of the sea, boats and sailors: it is a meeting of old riggings from around the world (Les Tonnerres de Brest).

History

The name of the town is first recorded as Bresta; it may derive from *brigs, a Celtic word for "hill."

Nothing definite is known of Brest before about 1240, when Harvey V, Lord of Léon ceded it to John I, Duke of Brittany. In 1342 John IV, Duke of Brittany surrendered Brest to the English, in whose possession it was to remain until 1397. This was strategically important to the English as it helped protect their communication with Gascony. The importance of Brest in medieval times was great enough to give rise to the saying, "He is not the Duke of Brittany who is not the Lord of Brest." With the marriage of Francis I of France to Claude, the daughter of Anne of Brittany, the definitive overlordship of Brest – together with the rest of the duchy – passed to the French crown in 1491.

The advantages of Brest's situation as a seaport town were first recognized by Cardinal Richelieu, who in 1631 constructed a harbour with wooden wharves. This soon became a base for the French Navy. Jean-Baptiste Colbert, finance minister under Louis XIV, rebuilt the wharves in masonry and otherwise improved the harbour. Fortifications by Vauban (1633–1707) followed in 1680–1688. These fortifications, and with them the naval importance of the town, were to continue to develop throughout the 18th century.

In 1694, an English squadron under Lord Berkeley was soundly defeated in its attack on Brest.

In 1917, during the First World War, Brest was used as the disembarking port for many of the troops coming from the United States. Thousands of such men came through the port on their way to the front lines. The United States Navy established a naval air station on 13 February 1918 to operate seaplanes. The base closed shortly after the Armistice of 11 November 1918.

In the Second World War, the Germans maintained a large U-boat submarine base at Brest. Despite being within range of RAF bombers, it was also a base for some of the German surface fleet, giving repair facilities and direct access to the Atlantic Ocean. The repair yard facilities for both submarines and surface vessels were staffed by both German and French workers, with the latter forming the major part of the workforce; huge reliance was made on this French component.

In 1944, after the Allied invasion of Normandy, the city was almost totally destroyed during the Battle for Brest, with only a tiny number of buildings left standing. After the war, the West German government paid several billion Deutschmarks in reparations to the homeless and destitute civilians of Brest in compensation for the destruction of their city. Large parts of today's rebuilt city consist of utilitarian granite and concrete buildings. The French naval base now houses the Brest Naval Training Centre.

During the postwar Nuremberg Trials, a memorandum of German admiral and  chief of staff Kurt Fricke from 1940 was given in evidence which suggested that the town should perhaps serve as a German enclave after the war.

In 1972, the French Navy opened its nuclear weapon-submarine (deterrence) base at Île Longue in the Rade de Brest (Brest roadstead). This continues to be an important base for the French nuclear-armed ballistic missile submarines.

Coat of arms
The meaning of the coat of arms of Brest is half France (the three fleurs-de-lis of the former kingdom of France), half Brittany (semé d'hermine of Brittany). These arms were used for the first time in a register of deliberations of the city council dated the 15 July 1683.

Sights

Pont de Recouvrance (Recouvrance Bridge, is a massive drawbridge 64 m/210 ft high), the military arsenal and the rue de Siam (Siam Street) are other sights. The castle and the Tanguy tower are the oldest monuments of Brest.

The Musée de la Tour Tanguy, in the Tanguy tower, houses a collection of dioramas that depict the city of Brest on the eve of World War II. The Musée national de la Marine de Brest, housed in the ancient castle, contains exhibits which outline Brest's maritime tradition, as well as an aquarium, the Océanopolis marine centre. The city also has a notable botanical garden specializing in endangered species, the Conservatoire botanique national de Brest, as well as the Jardin botanique de l'Hôpital d'Instruction des Armées Clermont-Tonnerre.

The city of Brest does not have much remaining historical architecture, apart from a few select monuments such as the castle and the Tanguy tower. This is due to heavy bombing by the Allies during World War II, in an attempt to destroy the submarine base the Germans had built in the harbour. In the 1950s, the town was hastily rebuilt using a large amount of concrete. In Recouvrance, the west bank of the town, there remains an authentic street of the 17th century, Saint-Malo Street.

A few kilometres out of town, there are landscapes, from sandy beaches to grottos to tall granite cliffs. Sunbathing, windsurfing, yachting and fishing are enjoyed in the area. Brest was an important warship-producing port during the Napoleonic wars. The naval port, which is in great part excavated in the rock, extends along both banks of the Penfeld river.

Geography

Brest is located amidst a dramatic landscape near the entrance of the natural rade de Brest (Brest roadstead), at the west end of Brittany.

It is situated to the north of a magnificent landlocked bay, and occupies the slopes of two hills divided by the river Penfeld. The part of the town on the left bank is regarded as Brest proper, while the part on the right is known as Recouvrance. There are also extensive suburbs to the east of the town. The hillsides are in some places so steep that the ascent from the lower to the upper town has to be effected by flights of steps and the second or third storey of one house is often on a level with the ground storey of the next.

Climate
Brest experiences an oceanic climate (Köppen: Cfb) in its classic version (due to its location in the Atlantic Ocean and the sea intrusion) where it shares a considerable moderation shared with other places of the Finistère and islands of Great Britain. As a result of the maritime moderation, Brest has very chilly summers by French standards and in spite of the low latitude, July afternoons are cooler than the norm in far northern Europe. Rainfall is common year-round, but snowfall is a rarer occurrence since temperatures usually remain several degrees above freezing during winter nights.

Population

In 1945 Brest absorbed three neighbouring communes. The population data for 1936 and earlier in the table and graph below refer to the pre-1945 borders.

Transport

The railway station of Brest, Gare de Brest, is linked to Rennes and Paris and provides services to other stations in Brittany as well. TGV trains to Paris take approximately three hours and forty minutes to reach the capital.

A new 28 stop,  tram line connecting Porte de Plouzané in the west with Porte de Gouesnou and Porte de Guipavas northeast of the city centre opened in June 2012.

Brest international airport, Brest Bretagne Airport, is mainly linked to Paris, London, Nice, Lyon, Dublin. The primary operator is Air France (via its subsidiary HOP!). Brest international airport is the main airport of the region of Brittany in terms passager traffic with 45% of this traffic of the region, representing 919,404 passengers in 2010. A new terminal has been in service since 12 December 2007 and can accommodate up to 1.8 million passengers annually.

The harbour of Brest is mainly dedicated to bulk, hydrocarbon and freight containers. The harbour's facilities can accommodate the largest modern ships. A cruise ship port is also located in Brest, near the city centre.

Economy

Due to its location, Brest is regarded as the first French port that can be accessed from the Americas. Shipping is big business, although Nantes and Saint-Nazaire offer much larger docks and attract more of the larger vessels. Brest has the ninth French commercial harbour including ship repairs and maintenance. The protected location of Brest means that its harbour is ideal to receive any type of ship, from the smallest dinghy to the biggest aircraft carrier ( has visited a few times).

Despite its image of an industrialised city whose activity depends mainly on military order, the service sector represents 75% of the economic activity. The importance of the service sector is still increasing while industrialised activity is decaying, explaining the unchanged rate of working-class in Brest. Brest also hosts headquarters for many subsidiaries like the banking group Arkéa. Research and conception is taking an increasing importance. Brest claims to be the largest European centre for sciences and techniques linked to the sea: 60% of the French research in the maritime field is based in Brest.

Administration

Mayors 
since 2001: François Cuillandre
1989–2001: Pierre Maille (2nd and 3rd terms)
1985–1989: Georges Kerbrat
1983–1985: Jacques Berthelot
1982–1983: Pierre Maille
1977–1982: Francis Le Blé
1973–1977: Eugène Berest
1959–1973: Georges Lombard
1958–1959: Auguste Kervern
1954–1958: Yves Jaouen
1954–1954: Lucien Chaix
1953–1954: Yves Jaouen
1947–1953: Alfred Pierre Marie Chupin
1945–1947: Jules Lullien
1944–1945: Jules Lullien
1942–1944: Victor Eusen
1929–1941: Victor Le Gorgeu
1921–1929: Léon Nardon
1920–1921: Hippolyte Masson
1919–1920: Louis Léon Nardon
1912–1919: Hippolyte Masson
1908–1912: Louis Arthur Delobeau
1904–1908: Victor Marie Aubert
1900–1904: Charles Berger

Breton language
Breton is not commonly spoken in the city of Brest, which was the only French-speaking city in western Brittany before the 1789 French Revolution, despite the surrounding countryside being fully Breton-speaking at that time. Like other French minority languages, Breton does not have any official language status in France.

The municipality launched a linguistic plan to revive Breton as a language through Ya d'ar brezhoneg on 16 June 2006. In 2008, 1.94% of primary-school children attended French-Breton bilingual Diwan schools. Besides bilingual schools, the Breton language is also taught in some schools and universities.

The association Sked federates all Breton cultural activities.

Culture

The city is host to several events to celebrate its long maritime history. The largest of these is held every four years, when the town organises a tall ship meeting. The last such tall ship event was "Les Tonnerres de Brest 2016". Due to the COVID-19 pandemic the next event is planned for 2022.

Brest also hosts an annual short film festival called "Brest European Short Film Festival". The city was the setting for the 1982 art film Querelle, directed by Rainer Werner Fassbinder, itself based on the 1947 novel Querelle de Brest by Jean Genet.

Cuisine
Brittany's most famous local delicacy, the Breton crêpe, is the main culinary feature apart from seafood. There are many crêpe restaurants (called crêperies). Breton apple cider is often featured.

Traditional biscuits include Traou Mad, which is a full-fat butter biscuit similar to Scottish shortbread.

Sport

Brest has held the Grands Départs of the Tour de France on three occasions, in 1952, 1974 and 2008. The 2021 Tour de France is due to start from Brest on 26 June 2021. Stage 6 of the 2018 Tour de France departed from Brest. Since 1901 Brest has served as the midpoint for the  bicycle endurance event, Paris–Brest–Paris.

Brest is home to Stade Brestois 29, a football team in Ligue 1. the top tier of the French football league system,

Brest is also home to Brest Albatros Hockey, an ice hockey team in Ligue Magnus, and won the league title in the 1996 and 1997.

In 2002 the Brest throwball team Brest LC reached the 1st division of French throwball but were subsequently relegated due to financial difficulty. The club has recently adopted an Irish influenced infrastructure.

Research and education

Primarily the research centre of western Brittany, Brest and its surrounding area is the home of several research and elite educational establishments:

 a multidisciplinary university, Université de Bretagne Occidentale (UBO) 
 Brest has also several grandes écoles and other undergraduate or graduate schools:
 École nationale d'ingénieurs de Brest (ENIB) (in Plouzané next to Brest) 
 Télécom Bretagne (ENST Bretagne) (in Plouzané next to Brest) 
 École nationale supérieure de techniques avancées de Bretagne (ENSTA Bretagne, formerly ENSIETA) 
 Institut supérieur de l'électronique et du numérique de Brest (ISEN Brest) 
 Brest Business School (ESC Bretagne Brest) 
 École Navale (French Naval Academy) (in Lanvéoc next to Brest) 
 To be noted that Brest is one of the hosts for the Indiana University Honors Foreign Language Program
 Brest has several research organisations:
 the largest Ifremer (French Research Institute for Exploitation of the Sea) centre (in Plouzané next to Brest); about 1000 people work there.
 Le Cedre (Centre of Documentation, Research and Experimentation on Accidental Water Pollution)
 the French Polar Institute (in Plouzané next to Brest)
 The Naval Hydrographic and Oceanographic Service (SHOM)

Notable people

Brest was the birthplace of:
 Jean-Michel Huon de Kermadec (1748–1792), navigator
 Charles-Alexandre Léon Durand Linois (1761–1848), admiral during the time of Napoleon Bonaparte
 Antoinette Lemonnier (1787–1866), operatic soprano
 Prosper Garnot (1794–1838), surgeon and naturalist
 Léon Moreau (1870–1946), composer
 Victor Segalen (1878–1919), naval doctor, ethnographer, archeologist, writer and poet
 Jean Cras (1879–1932), French composer and career naval officer
 Georges Thierry d'Argenlieu (1889–1964), priest, diplomat and French Navy officer and admiral
 Jean Loysel (1889–1962), composer and lyricist
 Alain Robbe-Grillet (1922–2008), writer and filmmaker
 Pierre Brice (1929–2015), actor
 Béatrice Dalle (born 1964), actress
 Christophe Miossec (born 1964), singer
 Benoît Hamon (born 1967), MEP and French presidential candidate, Parti Socialiste, 2017
 Yann Tiersen (born 1970), minimalist multi instrumentalist/musician
 Sébastien Flute (born 1972), Olympic gold medalist
 Benoît Menut (born 1977), composer
 Yohann Boulic (born 1978), footballer 
 Larsen Touré (born 1984), footballer (naturalized Guinean)
 Gonzalo Higuaín (born 1987), footballer (naturalized Argentine)
 Laury Thilleman (born 1991), Miss France 2011

International relations

Twin towns – Sister cities
Brest is twinned with:

 Denver, Colorado, United States (1948)
 Plymouth, Devon, England (1963) 
 Kiel, Germany (1964)
 Taranto, Italy (1964)
 Yokosuka, Kanagawa, Kantō, Japan (1970)
 Dún Laoghaire, Republic of Ireland (1984)
 Cádiz, Spain (1986)
 Saponé, Burkina Faso (1989)
 Constanța, Romania (1993)
 Qingdao, China (2006)
 Brest, Belarus (2012)

Friendly relationship
Brest has an official friendly relationship (protocole d'amitié) with:
 Bejaïa, Algeria (1995)

See also
Battle for Brest
Calvary at Plougastel-Daoulas
Communes of the Finistère department
Questel Fort

Notes

References

Bibliography

External links

 Aerial photos of the whole city and urban community
 Brest Airport Travel Guide
 Interactive City Map of Brest
 Official website of Brest town hall (with webcam)
 Satellite picture by Google Maps
 Brest Cultural Heritage 
 Brest improvisation theatre
 Wiki-Brest, a community wiki containing articles about the city (in French).
 German submarine base in Brest

 
Cities in France
Communes of Finistère
Populated coastal places in France
Port cities and towns on the French Atlantic coast
Subprefectures in France
Osismii
Brest